Inger Schörling (born 7 March 1946 in Kalvträsk) is a Swedish politician for the Miljöpartiet. Schörling made it to the Riksdagen after the election of 1988. In 1995, she was elected into the European Parliament where she worked with environmental, health and consumer questions. Schörling left the parliament in 2004 because of the parties rules of how long one person can stay in the European parliament.

References

External links 

1946 births
Living people
20th-century Swedish women politicians
Members of the Riksdag 1988–1991
21st-century Swedish women politicians
MEPs for Sweden 1999–2004
Members of the Riksdag from the Green Party
Green Party (Sweden) MEPs
20th-century women MEPs for Sweden
21st-century women MEPs for Sweden
Women members of the Riksdag